"Can You Hear Me Boys" is the fifth and final single released by Aloha from Hell.

Track listings
CD single
"Can You Hear Me Boys" (Single Version) - 3:00
"Can You Hear Me Boys" (Alternative Rock Club Remix) - 2:57

CD maxi-single
"Can You Hear Me Boys" (Single Version)- 3:00
"Can You Hear Me Boys" (Alternative Rock Club Remix) - 2:57
"Can You Hear Me Boys" (Live Session Remastered) - 2:57
"Girls Just Wanna Have Fun" (Live Session Remastered) - 3:28

Chart positions

References

External links
Aloha From Hell's official website

Aloha from Hell songs
2009 songs
Songs written by Michelle Leonard